Zulkarnaen bin Zainal (born 1 October 1973) is a retired Singaporean footballer. He played as a left-back or left midfielder. He was a member of the Singapore national football team that won the 1998 Tiger Cup. He also played in their 0–2 loss against Liverpool F.C and a 1–8 loss to Manchester United in an exhibition match at the Kallang Stadium.

Zainal started off his career at Admiralty as a promising young fullback in 1992 and was caught in the middle of a transfer controversy when the Football Association of Singapore banned him for eight months after discovering that he had registered himself with Admiralty and South Avenue, a club which plays in the First Division as well. The ban was later reduced to three months to allow him to be involved competitively after his recent seven-week training stint with FC Nitra in Slovakia.

Honours

International
Singapore
AFF Championship: 1998

References

External links
https://web.archive.org/web/20101223090328/http://www.fas.org.sg/default.asp?V_DOC_ID=1065

Living people
1973 births
Singaporean footballers
Tampines Rovers FC players
Singapore international footballers
Geylang International FC players
Tampines Rovers FC head coaches
Singapore Premier League head coaches
Woodlands Wellington FC players
Singapore Premier League players
Association football fullbacks
Singaporean football managers